Operation Avalanche is a 2016 American-Canadian found footage conspiracy thriller film directed by Matt Johnson, who co-wrote the film with Josh Boles. Johnson and Owen Williams star as CIA agents who infiltrate NASA to expose a potential mole, only to become embroiled in a conspiracy to fake the Moon landing portion of the 1969 Apollo 11 mission.

Plot 
The film opens with John F. Kennedy's "We choose to go to the Moon" speech.

In 1967, ambitious CIA agents Matt Johnson, Owen Williams, Andy Apelle, and Jared Raab convince their superiors to let them infiltrate NASA disguised as a documentary crew filming the Apollo 11 mission in an effort to root out a Soviet mole inside the organization.

After bugging administrator James Webb's phone, the crew discovers the lander built for the Moon landing is incapable of landing on the Moon, and NASA plans to keep it a secret. When they tell their superior, Brackett, they are told to leave NASA, which they disregard.

To cover up the inability of the lander and prevent the Russians from winning the Space Race, the crew starts "Operation Avalanche"—faking parts of the Moon landing, gaining the approval of Brackett. He sends agent Josh Boles to keep an eye on them.

Reviewing the footage of a NASA pool party, Jared notices two men filming them. Hearing of Stanley Kubrick filming 2001: A Space Odyssey, the crew travels to England, where they film the set with a hidden camera in hopes of copying his tactics. They learn about front screen projection, which they then use to make their faked Moon landing videos more convincing. They prepare a plan to fake the radio signals NASA receives from the lander, read out a pre-written script and broadcast the fake landing. Matt becomes frantic when he learns that, if his plan fails, the CIA plans to shoot down the real Apollo 11 lander and blame the Soviets. Matt begins burying finished footage in a field.

During a shoot, Owen notices a pair of men watching them. When the crew approaches them, they drive away. Boles informs them that they have caught the mole, but he does not seem to be involved with the men watching them. When Owen examines interview footage with the mole, he realizes he was the other man on the phone with Webb, leading him to believe the mole, Boles, and the men watching them are all part of the CIA. After the "mole" dies, Owen believes the CIA is planning to finish them off to tie up loose ends.

After finishing Avalanche, Matt gives a copy to Boles and cuts up a copy with footage proving the fake. The faked launch goes off without a hitch, and Matt burns the props used in the videos. Finding the motel room they were using trashed and men sweeping the premises, Matt, Jared, and Andrew dig up Matt's copy of the film. As they leave with it, they are attacked by a car that shoots at them, narrowly escaping.

Matt finds Owen hanged in his garage. He gives the film canisters to Andrew and sends him to go hide them. He calls Brackett on a payphone and offers to trade his location for the names of the agents the CIA plans to eliminate. He threatens to release his uncut copy, and Brackett offers to make him head of his own department, but Matt declines. As a forlorn Matt watches the "Moon landing" play on local television and looks into the camera at the last second, Creedence Clearwater Revival's "Fortunate Son" plays over America celebrating the Apollo 11 landing.

Cast 
Many of the actors, including the five leads, used their real names and are shown in the end credits as “Himself” or “Herself”.

Production 
Production took place in Toronto, Houston, and Washington, D.C., starting June 30, 2014.  The NASA scenes were shot on location.  To get permission, Johnson told them he was making a student documentary.  Additional scenes were accomplished through liberal application of newly-permissive fair use laws.

Release 
Operation Avalanche premiered at the Sundance Film Festival. Johnson had received an offer to premiere the film at the Toronto International Film Festival but declined, reasoning that the film would be lost in the large number of films shown there.  Lionsgate released it in the US on September 16, 2016.

Reception 
Rotten Tomatoes, a review aggregator, reports that 69% of 62 surveyed critics gave the film a positive review; the average rating is 6.5/10. Metacritic gave it a 69/100 score, based on 18 reviews.  Peter Debruge of Variety wrote, "Matt Johnson and Owen Williams' wild, borderline-illegal stunt delivers big time on its crazy premise."  John DeFore of The Hollywood Reporter called it a "likeable if not always convincing fantasy that gets much mileage from its period feel".  Anthony Kaufman of Screen Daily wrote that the film "comes across more as a rambling lark than a tightly conceived film".

Accolades

See also
 Moon landing conspiracy theories in popular culture

References

External links 
 

2016 films
2010s political thriller films
American political thriller films
Canadian political thriller films
2010s English-language films
Films about conspiracy theories
Films about filmmaking
Films about the Apollo program
Moon landing conspiracy theories
Found footage films
English-language Canadian films
2010s American films
2010s Canadian films